WAQY (102.1 FM) is a radio station in Springfield, Massachusetts, broadcasting a classic rock format. Since the late 1980s, the station has been known as "Rock 102".

History
102.1 FM in Springfield signed on December 17, 1966, as WCRX. The call letters stood for "Charles River Broadcasting extension," the station being a sister and extension of 102.5 FM WCRB-FM in Boston, Massachusetts. Both the Springfield and Boston stations programmed a classical music radio format overseen by Charles River Broadcasting owner Theodore Jones.

In the mid-1970s, owners Don Wilks and Mike Schwartz decided to put the first automated rock and roll station on the air.  Their program direction, Jim Boldebook, was given the task of programming a Shafer automation system.  WAQY broadcast top 40 music with song titles every third song and no on-the-air DJ. DJs went live starting in 1976.

In August 1981, WAQY switched to a rock music format known as AOR. Now known simply by the station’s call letters, WAQY played a mix of new rock music from the 1980s mixed with older rock artists of the '60s (The Beatles, Jimi Hendrix etc.) and 1970s (Black Sabbath, Led Zeppelin, etc.) Artists played included then current and popular Arena rock favorites Blue Öyster Cult, Journey, Foreigner and Fleetwood Mac as well as singer and songwriter artists from Tom Petty to Billy Joel. Hard rock and heavy metal acts like AC/DC, Van Halen and Rush were also core artists. In the mid-1980s, WAQY adopted its current moniker "Rock 102" playing up to five current rock songs an hour. By 1992, WAQY stopped playing current music and completed its evolution from an AOR to a classic rock format.

The station serves as the Pioneer Valley's affiliate for the New England Patriots radio network.

Technical
WAQY transmits 17,000 watts from the top of Provin Mountain in Feeding Hills on the WWLP tower.
WAQY transmits using a 4-bay Continental (ERI) center-fed antenna and a Nautel NV20 HD  transmitter. WAQY's signal covers all of the Springfield, Massachusetts, market, and can be heard as far south as Long Island, New York. WAQY is running a high-level IBOC (HD Digital signal) at -14db versus the normal -20db. WAQY simulcasts sister station WLZX-FM on its HD2 subchannel.

References

External links
Official WAQY "ROCK 102" website

AQY
Classic rock radio stations in the United States
Radio stations established in 1966
Mass media in Springfield, Massachusetts
1966 establishments in Massachusetts